Oh, OH, or Oh! is an interjection, often proclaiming surprise.  It may refer to:

Arts and entertainment

Music

Albums
 Oh! (Girls' Generation album), 2010
 Oh! (ScoLoHoFo album), 2003
 OH (ohio), by Lambchop, 2008
 Oh!, an EP that came with the preorders of Oh! Gravity. by Switchfoot, 2006

Songs
 "O (Oh!)", 1920 by Ted Lewis, 1953 by Pee Wee Hunt
 "Oh" (Ciara song), 2005
 "Oh!" (Girls' Generation song), 2010
 "Oh!" (Pink Lady song), 1981
 "Oh" (Stray Kids song), 2021
 "Oh!", by Boys Noize from Oi Oi Oi
 "Oh!", by The Breeders from Pod
 "Oh", by Dave Matthews from Some Devil
 "Oh", by Fugazi from The Argument
 "Oh", by Juliana Hatfield from Made in China
 "Oh!", by Micky Green from White T-Shirt
 "Oh!", by Sleater-Kinney from One Beat
 "Oh", by Spratleys Japs from Pony
 "Oh!", by The Trudy
 "Oh," by Underworld, recorded for the soundtrack to A Life Less Ordinary, 1997

Other media
 Oh! (TV channel), an Australian cable TV channel owned by Optus Television
 Oxygen, an American TV channel formerly called "Oh!"
 Oh, a Boov alien from Home (2015)

People
 Oh (surname), Korean surname romanized as "Oh" or "O"
 Oh (Japanese surname), Japanese surname derived from Wang(王)
 Ou (surname), Chinese and Cantonese surnames pronounced as "Oh" or "O"
 Dennis Oh, Korean actor
 Nadia Oh, English vocalist

Science and technology

Chemistry
 OH, hydroxyl functional group
 OH−, hydroxide
 •OH, hydroxyl radical
 OH, the functional alcohol group in a molecule

Other uses in science and technology
 OH, prefix of hominid fossils found at Olduvai Gorge
 OH, designation in the Unified Soil Classification System for organic-rich clay or silt of high plasticity
 Oh, the point group of octahedral molecular geometry
 Ohnesorge number, a dimensionless number that relates the viscous forces to inertial and surface tension forces
 Oral hygiene

Transportation
 OH, registration prefix for aircraft registered in Finland
 Comair (IATA airline code OH)
 PSA Airlines (IATA airline code OH)
 Observation helicopter, in military abbreviation

Other uses
 Ohio, US (postal abbreviation)
 O.H., post-nominal letters for the Brothers Hospitallers of Saint John of God